Father Henryk Jankowski (18 December 1936, in Starogard Gdański – 12 July 2010, in Gdańsk) was a Polish Roman Catholic priest, member of Solidarity movement and one of the priests supporting that movement in opposition to the communist government in the 1980s. He was also a long serving provost of St. Bridget's church in Gdańsk (until 2004). In the late 1990s he became known for his critique of the European Union and for anti-Semitic remarks, and was suspended from preaching for a year.  Father Jankowski was accused of being a pedophile and child rapist but was never convicted. The issue is still being investigated, remains a matter of discussion and an object of press's interest.

According to records saved in Instytut Pamięci Narodowej Henryk Jankowski since 1980 to 1982 was an operational contact codename "Delegat" of communist Służba Bezpieczeństwa.

He supported the Father Henryk Jankowski Institute, described as supporting charities and social projects, by sales of a wine with his image on the label, sold under the name "Monsignore", and had plans to open a chain of 16 cafés in major Polish cities and to market perfume and clothing also bearing his image.

In February 2019 the statue of Jankowski in Gdańsk was toppled by a group of protestors and ultimately liquidated on 8 March 2019.

See also 

 Radio Maryja
 Polonica.net
 Catholic sex abuse cases

References

1936 births
2010 deaths
Polish Roman Catholic priests
Solidarity (Polish trade union) activists
Antisemitism in Poland
Polish dissidents
Catholic Church sexual abuse scandals in Poland
People from Starogard Gdański